Rock of Ages is a 1918 British silent drama film directed by Bertram Phillips and starring Queenie Thomas, Leslie George and Ronald Power. An Irish model converts an artist to religion. Its title refers to the hymn Rock of Ages.

Cast
 Queenie Thomas - Biddie Kinsella
 Leslie George - Austin Summers
 Ronald Power - The Master
 Bernard Vaughan - Father O'Flynn
 Charles Garry - Pat Reilly
 Lottie Blackford - Widdie Kinsella
 Ernest A. Douglas - Priest

References

External links
 

1918 films
1918 drama films
British silent feature films
Films directed by Bertram Phillips
British drama films
British black-and-white films
1910s British films
Silent drama films